Sirpa Ryhänen (born 27 November 1966) is a Finnish cross-country skier. She competed in the women's 15 kilometre classical event at the 1992 Winter Olympics.

Cross-country skiing results
All results are sourced from the International Ski Federation (FIS).

Olympic Games

World Championships

World Cup

Season standings

References

External links
 

1966 births
Living people
Finnish female cross-country skiers
Olympic cross-country skiers of Finland
Cross-country skiers at the 1992 Winter Olympics
People from Ilomantsi
Sportspeople from North Karelia
20th-century Finnish women